KIFX (98.5 FM) is a radio station broadcasting an adult contemporary format. Licensed to Naples, Utah, United States, the station is currently owned by Evans Broadcasting, Inc. and features programming from ABC Radio  and CNN Radio.

History
The station was known as KBWL, beginning on 11 June 1987. On 1 September 1991, the station changed its call sign to the current KIFX.

References

External links

IFX
Radio stations established in 1988
1988 establishments in Utah